Eva Bes Ostáriz (born 14 January 1973) is a former professional tennis player from Spain.

She won a total of six singles and 29 doubles titles on the ITF Circuit during her career. On 4 March 2002, she reached a singles ranking high of world No. 90. On 22 May 2000, she peaked at No. 71 in the WTA doubles rankings.

As a junior, Bes was the 1991 French Open girls' doubles champion.

She retired from professional tennis in 2003.

Personal
Coached by her brother, Pablo Bes, Eva's favorite surface has been clay; best shot is forehand. Father, Rafael, is a doctor; mother, MaPilar, is a housewife; has three brothers, Rafael, Pablo and Jorge, two of whom are tennis coaches. Admires Gabriel Urpi, her first coach. Favorite tournament has been Roland Garros.

WTA career finals

Doubles: 2 (2 runner-ups)

ITF Circuit finals

Singles: 14 (6–8)

Doubles: 49 (29–20)

Junior Grand Slam finals

Girls' doubles (1–0)

See also
 List of French Open champions

External links
 
 

1973 births
Living people
Sportspeople from Zaragoza
Spanish female tennis players
French Open junior champions
Grand Slam (tennis) champions in girls' doubles